Alberto is the Romance version of the Latinized form (Albertus) of Germanic Albert. It is used in Italian, Portuguese and Spanish. The diminutive forms are Albertito in Spain or Albertico in some parts of Latin America, Albertino in Italian as well as Tuco as a hypocorism. It derives from the name Adalberto which in turn derives from Athala (meaning noble) and Berth (meaning bright).

People 

 Alberto Aguilar Leiva (born 1984), Spanish footballer
 Alberto Airola (born 1970), Italian politician
 Alberto Ascari (1918–1955), Italian racing driver
 Alberto Baldonado (born 1993), Panamanian baseball player
 Alberto Bello (1897–1963), Argentine actor
 Alberto Beneduce (1877–1944), Italian scientist and economist
 Alberto Bustani Adem (born 1954), Mexican engineer
 Alberto Callaspo (born 1983,) baseball player
 Alberto Campbell-Staines (born 1993), Australian athlete with an intellectual disability
 Alberto Cavalcanti (1897–1982), Brazilian film producer
 Alberto Cerri (born 1996), Italian footballer
 Alberto Cianca (1884–1966), Italian journalist and politician
 Alberto Cifuentes (born 1979), Spanish footballer, known as "Alberto"
 Alberto Clò (born 1947), Italian businessman and politician
 Alberto Contador (born 1982), Spanish cyclist
 Alberto Cortez (born 1940), Argentine musician
 Alberto Costa (British politician) (born 1971)
 Alberto Costa (Portuguese politician) (born 1947)
 Alberto Domínguez (composer) (1913–1975), Mexican composer and marimbist
 Alberto Edjogo-Owono (born 1984), Equato-guinean footballer, known as "Alberto"
 Alberto Escassi (born 1989), Spanish footballer
 Alberto Espinoza Barrón, Mexican drug trafficker
 Alberto Estrella (born 1962), Mexican actor
 Alberto Fabra (born 1964), Spanish politician
 Alberto Fanesi (born 1948), Argentine football manager
 Alberto Fernández (born 1959), Argentine politician, president since December 2019
 Alberto Fernández (cyclist) (1955–1984), Spanish cyclist
 Alberto Franceschini (born 1947), Italian terrorist
 Alberto Franchetti (1860–1942), Italian composer
 Alberto Frezza (born 1989), Italian–American actor
 Alberto Frison (born 1988), Italian footballer
 Alberto Fujimori (born 1938), President of Peru
 Alberto García (athlete) (born 1971), Spanish long distance and cross-country runner
 Alberto Giacometti (1901–1966), Swiss sculptor, painter, draughtsman, and printmaker
 Alberto Gianni (1891–1930), Italian underwater diver
 Alberto Gilardino (born 1982), Italian footballer
 Alberto Ginastera (1916–1983), Argentine composer
 Alberto Gonzales (born 1955), American politician
 Alberto González (baseball) (born 1983), Venezuelan baseball player
 Alberto Grimaldi (1925–2021), Italian film producer
 Alberto Loddo (born 1979), former Italian cyclist
 Alberto Lopo (born 1980), footballer
 Alberto Lora (born 1987), Spanish footballer
 Alberto Losada (born 1982), Spanish cyclist
 Alberto Magnelli, Italian artist
 Alberto Martín (born 1978), Spanish tennis player
 Alberto Martínez (footballer, born 1950) (1950–2009), Uruguayan footballer
 Alberto Martínez Díaz (born 1962), Spanish footballer
 Alberto Miguel (born 1977), Spanish basketball player
 Alberto Mondi (born 1984), Italian television personality and businessman active in South Korea
 Alberto Moreno, Spanish footballer
 Alberto Naranjo (born 1941), Venezuelan musician
 Alberto Oliart (1928–2021), Spanish politician
 Alberto Martinez Piedra (born 1926), Cuban-American professor
 Alberto Palatchi, Spanish billionaire
 Alberto Pullicino (1719–1759), Maltese painter
 Alberto Marcos Rey (born 1969), Spanish footballer, known as "Alberto"
 Alberto Del Rio (born 1977), Mexican wrestler
 Alberto Rivera (activist), American and anti-Catholic publisher
 Alberto Romualdez, Filipino politician and doctor
 Alberto Salazar (born 1958), American track coach and long-distance runner
 Alberto Santos-Dumont, (1873–1932), Brazilian aviation pioneer
Alberto Simonini (1896–1960), Italian politician
 Alberto Sordi, (1920–2003),  Italian actor
 Alberto Tomba (born 1966), former World Cup alpine ski racer from Italy,  dominant technical skier (slalom and giant slalom) in the late 1980s and 1990s
 Alberto van Klaveren (born 1948), Dutch-born Chilean diplomat and lawyer
 Alberto Yarini (1882–1910), Cuban pimp
 Alberto Zedda (born 1928), Italian conductor

Fictional characters 
 Alberto Bertorelli, a character in the BBC sitcom 'Allo 'Allo!
 Alberto Molina, from the TV series Arthur
 Alberto Scorfano, A character in Disney Pixar movie Luca

Other uses 
 "Alberto," an Upstairs, Downstairs episode
 Alberto, a comic made by fundamentalist Jack Chick about a man called Alberto Rivera who claimed to be an ex-Jesuit priest
 Hurricane Alberto, a name given to several hurricanes
 Alberto-Culver, American cosmetics company

See also 
 Albert
 Albert (surname)
 Albertus (given name)
 Adalberto
 Albertet, an Occitan diminutive of Albert
 Adalbert (name)
 Berto (disambiguation)
 Carlos Alberto

References 

Italian masculine given names
Portuguese masculine given names
Spanish masculine given names
Sammarinese given names